Henry Curtis VC (21 December 1822 – 23 November 1896) was an English recipient of the Victoria Cross (VC), the highest and most prestigious award for gallantry in the face of the enemy that can be awarded to British and Commonwealth forces.

Details
Curtis was 32 years old and a Boatswain's Mate in the Royal Navy (Naval Brigade) during the Crimean War when the following deed took place for which he was awarded the VC.

On 18 June 1855, in the Crimea, immediately after the assault on Sebastopol, a soldier of the 57th Regiment, who had been wounded in both legs, was observed sitting up and calling for help. At once the second-in-command of the scaling party (Henry James Raby), another seaman (John Taylor) and Boatswain's Mate Curtis left the shelter of their battery works and ran forward a distance of 70 yards, across open ground, through heavy gunfire and succeeded in carrying the wounded man to safety.

Medal location
The VC is on display in the Lord Ashcroft Gallery at the Imperial War Museum, London.

References

External links
 Location of grave and VC medal (Hampshire)
 VC medal auction details
 
 Portsmouth Memorial Page

1822 births
1896 deaths
People from Romsey
Royal Navy sailors
British recipients of the Victoria Cross
Crimean War recipients of the Victoria Cross
Royal Navy personnel of the Crimean War
Royal Navy recipients of the Victoria Cross
Military personnel from Hampshire
Burials in Hampshire